William Henry Taylor (born 23 December 1956) was the last provost (and first dean) of Portsmouth Cathedral.

He was educated at the University of Kent, Tübingen, Lancaster and London, from where he was awarded a PhD (SOAS) in Ottoman Syriac Studies. He was ordained in 1984 and began his career as Assistant Curate at All Saints, Canterbury. After this he was the Archbishop of Canterbury's Advisor on Orthodox Affairs at Lambeth Palace and then senior curate at All Saints, Margaret Street, Westminster. He was CMS chaplain in Jordan from 1988-91, and then Vicar of St Peter's Church, Ealing, and Area Dean of Ealing, 1993-98.

From 2000-02 he was provost (subsequently dean) of Portsmouth Cathedral. He resigned after two years following a dispute with the then Bishop.

Since 2002, he has been Vicar of St John's, Notting Hill, and Chairman of the Anglican and Eastern Churches Association. 

He edited, together with the Roman Catholic priest, Father Michael Prior (1942-2004), Christians in the Holy Land (1994), and is the author of Antioch and Canterbury (Gorgias Press, 2005). He is a director of Jerusalem and the Middle East Church Association (JMECA) and a Freeman of the City of London.

Notes

1956 births
Alumni of the University of Kent
Provosts and Deans of Portsmouth
Living people